Invader Zim is an American animated science fiction dark comedy television series created by comic book writer and cartoonist Jhonen Vasquez for Nickelodeon. The series centers on an extraterrestrial named Zim (voiced by Richard Steven Horvitz), from the planet Irk, and his mission to conquer Earth and enslave the human race along with his malfunctioning robot servant GIR (the best character) (Rosearik Rikki Simons). He is antagonized by Dib (Andy Berman), a young paranormal investigator who is determined to stop Zim from succeeding.

Nickelodeon contacted Jhonen Vasquez about pitching ideas for an animated series for their older demographic and Invader Zim was the first thing he pitched. In Vasquez's words "it went from pitch to series without hardly any waiting". As the series went on, ratings declined and budgetary issues became more frequent. Before the second season was completed, Nickelodeon cancelled the series, leaving several episodes unfinished. The show originally aired on Nickelodeon from 2001 to 2002, with six of the completed second-season episodes initially going unreleased. These episodes were first made available on DVD in 2004 and later made their television debut on the Nicktoons Network in 2006.

Invader Zim received positive reviews from critics and audiences, with praise primarily directed at its humor, writing, animation, art-style, and the way it pushed the boundaries of what was considered acceptable on children's television. In the years following its cancellation, Invader Zim has often been listed as one of Nickelodeon's best shows. The series won an Annie Award, an Emmy Award and a World Animation Celebration Award, and received nominations for seven additional Annie Awards and two Golden Reel Awards. Invader Zim has spawned its own fan convention called InvaderCON and a plethora of official merchandise, including video games, toys, clothing and accessories, among many other products. Despite its early cancellation, due to increasing popularity and above-average merchandise sales it has been widely regarded as a cult classic.

A monthly comic book series of the same name was released on July 8, 2015, as a continuation of the television series and published by Oni Press until August 4, 2021. A film based on the television and comic series, titled Invader Zim: Enter the Florpus, premiered on Netflix on August 16, 2019.

Plot

The series centers on Zim (voiced by Richard Steven Horvitz), a member of the extraterrestrial Irken species and the Irken Empire from the planet Irk. The imperialistic empire's goal is universal conquest and has a social hierarchy based solely on physical height. The empire's leader is called The Almighty Tallest; at the beginning of the series the position is jointly held by two equally tall individuals (Wally Wingert and Kevin McDonald.) Zim is an outcast; he is delusional, very short, overzealous, narcissistic, and megalomaniacal.

An absentminded Zim nearly destroyed Irk and the Irkens during the empire's first invasion, Operation Impending Doom I. He was punished by exile to the Irken food court planet Foodcourtia, although he failed to recognize the reason for his banishment. After learning that Operation Impending Doom II was being planned, Zim unilaterally "quits being banished" to attend the Great Assigning on the convention center planet Conventia. At the Great Assigning, The Tallest appoints Irkens as Invaders, advance scouts tasked with infiltrating and preparing target planets for conquest by the Irken Armada. Zim successfully pleads to be made an Invader, and receives a "secret mission" intended to prevent interference with the invasion; the target "mystery planet" is on the outskirts of the known universe and is not confirmed to exist. He is issued GIR (Rosearik Rikki Simons), an ineffective and erratic Standard Issue Information Retrieval (SIR) unit hastily made from spare parts found in a trash can.

After a six month journey across the universe, Zim arrives at the "mystery planet" which turns out to be dark, dystopian, and satirical version of Earth. A delighted Zim quickly goes to work and sets up his base in a random suburb; The Tallest are dismayed by his success. A short-statured Zim disguises himself as a human child with a green complexion (which he claims is caused by a "skin condition".) The show follows his attempts to conduct espionage by attending a local school (spelled "Skool"), and planning to conquer and enslave the world at his base. Opposing Zim is his classmate Dib (Andy Berman), a paranoid young boy who is obsessed with the paranormal and supernatural and the only human (besides his sister) who sees through Zim's disguise. Dib is determined to expose and thwart Zim, despite the hostility and mockery he receives from his oblivious peers for doing so.

Supporting characters include Dib's cynical and apathetic sister Gaz (Melissa Fahn); Zim and Dib's demonic teacher Ms. Bitters (Lucille Bliss); and Dib and Gaz's famous, but neglectful father Professor Membrane (Rodger Bumpass). Later in the series, other alien characters begin to appear, including Tak (Olivia d'Abo), a fellow Irken seeking revenge against Zim; Lard Nar (Fred Tatasciore), the leader of a resistance group called The Resisty who wants to overthrow the Irken Empire; and Sizz-Lorr (Jim Wise), Zim's former employer from Foodcourtia who attempts to recapture him.

Episodes

Production

Conception and early development

 Prior to the creation of Invader Zim, Nickelodeon desired a series to suit its 11–15 year old demographic. Nickelodeon producer Mary Harrington was searching for something that had a similar "edge" to The Ren & Stimpy Show, when she came across a comic book called Johnny the Homicidal Maniac and was impressed with the art-style and character designs in the series. Harrington contacted the creator of JtHM, then-22-year-old Jhonen Vasquez, who had zero experience in animation at the time, and asked him if he would like to pitch an animated series to Nickelodeon. Vasquez accepted the offer.

Vasquez knew from the start that his previous works were definitely not suitable for Nickelodeon, so instead of adapting something he had already done, he decided to make something new. Since he was creating a show for a children's network, Vasquez compiled together many things he loved during his own childhood, including robots, monsters, horror films, science fiction films, paranormal investigators, Monty Python, the works of Douglas Adams, and aliens. Before settling on the darker concept of an alien invader, Vasquez briefly considered doing a more light-hearted show along the lines of Mork & Mindy, with a zany alien misunderstanding Earth customs and ultimately, learning a lesson at the end. Vasquez said that while this idea probably would have found more success on Nickelodeon, he quickly dropped the idea, believing it would not fit his style of writing. Vasquez came up with the entire premise for Invader Zim in about an hour, while sitting in bed when he could not sleep. He was inspired by the idea of an alien who came from an incredibly advanced race and has access to such powerful and advanced technology that he could easily take over or destroy the Earth single-handedly, but instead he decides to stay in school all day, never even thinking to sneak out.

A pilot for Invader Zim was pitched to Nickelodeon in 1999, which led to the series being green-lit. Vasquez indicated that very little of his writing style was changed over the course of Invader Zim, other than restricting certain language and visuals that may not be suitable for children. Vasquez cited that the biggest change for himself was going from working alone on a comic to working with thousands of people at Nickelodeon, saying "it's an absolute misery". However, he said the experience of working on Invader Zim was "incredibly gratifying", but also "fiendishly frustrating".

Animation
Invader Zim was produced by Nickelodeon Animation Studios in Burbank, California with Nick Digital providing the CGI animation services and Sunwoo Entertainment in South Korea providing the 2D animation services. Salami Studios provided the post-production and sound services for most episodes of the series, and Encore and Hollywood Digital provided the post-production services for a few episodes in season one. In season two, the animation style became slightly more stylized and pronounced in motion than in season one. Invader Zims art style is stylized with sharp edges, thick black outlines, big heads, small or elongated bodies, and big eyes for the characters. Invader Zim'''s art-style was initially difficult for the animators to learn. Director Steve Ressel even admitted that it was the hardest style he had ever worked on, citing the characters' heads as the most complicated aspect of their designs.Invader Zim was one of the first animated television shows to merge 2D animation with CGI animation. When the development on Invader Zim was first getting started, Steve Ressel consulted with the crew of Futurama to figure out how to integrate 2D animation with CGI animation, since they were one of the first animated television shows that merged the two mediums. When the Futurama crew saw the show they were very impressed by how seamlessly the Invader Zim crew integrated both mediums, specifically in the episode "The Wettening".

While the average episode of an eleven-minute animated television show usually has around 80–120 pages of storyboards per episode, Invader Zims storyboards were around 250–350 pages per episode. This is because Invader Zim has a very dedicated attention to detail outlining every ounce of a character's movements and method of acting, which is something Nickelodeon was very impressed by.

The episode "Zim Eats Waffles" was originally supposed to be one long shot, panning between Dib's reaction and his computer screen. This was because the animators wanted to try to have the longest single shot in animation history. 
However, this idea was scrapped, due to it limiting the episode's storytelling capabilities and it being too difficult to animate. Despite this decision, the majority of "Zim Eats Waffles" still ended up being one continual scene.

Voice acting

When casting voice actors for Invader Zim, Vasquez did not want actors who were just capable of doing zany voices because it sounded less natural to him. He made a point to cast people with speaking voices that were naturally distinct and out of the ordinary so that the cast did not have to do unnatural voices, but could instead just speak naturally.

Mark Hamill was originally hired to do the voice of Zim for the pilot episode, but was replaced before the pilot was shown to Nickelodeon executives because Vasquez felt his voice did not feel right for the character. Hamill was replaced by voice acting professional Billy West, who remained the voice of Zim for the pilot. After the show was picked up for a full series, Vasquez decided to replace West with Richard Steven Horvitz, saying that West was "too well known" and that he wanted all of the voices for the main characters to be unique and not voices people had heard before. Also, due to Futurama still being on the air at the time, Vasquez did not want the same voice actor to be the lead in two contemporaneous sci-fi comedies.

Vasquez wanted someone with no experience in voice acting to play the part of GIR, as a reflection of how broken and messed up GIR really is. Vasquez wanted someone who sounded unprofessional, but all of the actors who auditioned for GIR were "good actors" who just did a "stock crazy robot voice", which he found dissatisfying. Vasquez then asked his friend, Rosearik Rikki Simons, who was working with him on his comic called I Feel Sick at the time, to try to audition for GIR, saying he "couldn't screw it up anymore than anyone else". Simons did a few different voices for his audition for GIR, including one where he was trying to imitate his mother-in-law, but decided it was too "shrieky". He then remembered when he used to play with hand puppets with his father as a kid and tried to do one of those voices. Simons was also a colorist on Invader Zim and in November 1998, the same month he auditioned for GIR, he also helped color the pilot episode. Vasquez said he gave Simons the part of GIR because he was "bad at it", and that fit the character. When voicing GIR, Simons' voice was edited to make it sound higher-pitched and metallic. While Simons eventually learned to perform the voice without the high-pitch editing, the metallic quality still had to be added. Unedited versions of Simons' voice-overs can be heard in voice recordings for the unfinished episodes.

Music
 Vasquez asked his friend Mark Tortorici to come up with the theme music for Invader Zim. Vasquez said all he really wanted for the theme music was military music to represent Zim mixed with futuristic electric orchestral music. Once the direction for the music was settled on, Tortorici produced the theme music on an Alesis QS8 very quickly and it did not go through many changes, but they did reorchestrate it for the TV series and stuck with it from that point on.

Vasquez's team selected Michael Tavera, who is known for composing the music for The Land Before Time, An American Tail, and Stitch! The Movie, to compose the music for the pilot episode of Invader Zim. Vasquez said that he asked for several of the tracks that Tavera produced to be discarded and that ultimately the team had less than half of the number of tracks that they planned to submit. According to Vasquez, he and Tavera were not "a great fit" for one another creatively. Vasquez described the pilot music as having a "more 'children's television' sound," with a "much more traditional and not as surprising" theme as he wanted, but added that the music "worked for the pilot." Tavera's cover version of Tortorici's theme music did not appear in the pilot as there was no opening credits sequence. Vasquez said that members of the Invader Zim crew laughed at Tavera's version of the theme because it was "cheesy," adding that the reaction was not mean-spirited and that Tavera had received little information about the series before submitting the music.

Tavera did not become a part of the regular Invader Zim crew, and was replaced with Kevin Manthei, who is also known for composing the music for Generator Rex, The Sims 2, and Robot Chicken, to compose the series' music. Manthei's music for the series is industrial and techno in nature.

The anime internet radio station, "Anime Stuff R" did a radio broadcast special called, "The Kevin Manthei Invader Zim-phony Special" which featured a majority of the music Kevin Manthei composed for Invader Zim. The broadcast special was hosted by Kevin Manthei, DJ Richard Rae and Tom Mitchell (DJ Tomzer1) and was broadcast from September 13, 2002, to October 15, 2002. The entire broadcast is 5 hours, 26 minutes, and 28 seconds long and includes music from every episode of Invader Zim, except for "The Most Horrible X-mas Ever". The broadcast was extremely popular, so Anime Stuff R (temporarily renamed "Anime Stuff Z" for the special) decided to release a CD of the broadcast. However, due to financial reasons, they only made 100 copies of this CD. There are 325 tracks on the CD and the interior of the CD cover features messages from both Kevin Manthei and Richard Rae.

Kevin Manthei's message says: 

Richard Rae's message says:

Challenges and censorshipInvader ZIM would frequently find itself at odds with network censorship. In The Medium-Sized Book of ZIM Scrips Vol. 1, series writer Eric Trueheart would characterize the relationship between the ZIM staff and the executives at Nickelodeon as "a little dysfunctional", and that "the executive assigned by Nickelodeon to oversee our show - who was, and still is, a decent guy, by the way - probably felt like he had to keep a lid on an inexperienced show creator, and as a result clamped down harder than he should have." Trueheart also speculated that the channel's other programming also had an effect on how the executives treated the show, stating that "Nickelodeon probably looked to Rugrats as the model of what a cartoon should be ... Invader ZIM was none of these things." Ultimately, "There was a just a conflict in personalities, intentions, and modus operandi ... The reality was just not a great fit, and yes, it was a problem."

In some episodes, it was originally intended for certain characters (such as Keef and Iggins) to be killed off at the end of an episode, but Nickelodeon would not allow any characters to be killed off and demanded the crew add certain details suggesting that they survived or in some cases, rewrite the episodes to where they would not die. They complied, however did so in an intentionally forced and sarcastic way to purposely convey their disagreement and reluctance toward the decision, such as the sarcastic "No characters were harmed in this episode" end-card message at the end of the episode "Hamstergeddon" where many background characters "died" onscreen.

In the DVD commentary for the episode "Bad, Bad Rubber Piggy", Jhonen Vasquez reveals that the original idea for the episode was for Zim to kill Dib off permanently, and for Dib to be replaced with a new kid named Louie. But once again, Nickelodeon would not allow any characters to be killed off permanently and so this did not end up happening. However, the episode's writer, Eric Trueheart, has stated that this was only meant to be taken as a joke, and that "Jhonen at no point thought he would actually kill off one of the lead characters in the series."

In "Door to Door" the virtual reality world that Zim shows people was originally going to involve a demolished city that resembled New York, but Nickelodeon demanded that this be changed due to its similarities to 9/11. On reflection, Vasquez said that he prefers the new virtual reality world to the old one, since he does not like the idea of a real-life city existing in Invader Zim. The original version of this scene can be found online. Additionally, the episode "Hamstergeddon" had only aired once prior to the attacks on the World Trade Center, and would shortly thereafter be temporarily withheld from rotation as "[executives] thought the sight of falling buildings would not go over well with sensitive viewers."

One of the biggest problems Nickelodeon had with the show before it premiered was with Dib's design. Vasquez wanted Dib to wear a trench coat, but Nickelodeon opted against this because they feared Dib's clothing would remind people of the Columbine High School massacre, in which the two teenagers responsible for the shootings both wore trench coats during the attack. Nickelodeon ultimately lost this fight and Dib ended up wearing a trench coat in the show.

Later, Nickelodeon wanted to cut Dib from the show outright because they did not think he was funny or interesting enough. Vasquez fought back with a project called "God Save the Dib", which involved making slight changes to Dib's character to make him more funny and interesting in order to avoid Nickelodeon cutting him from the show. One notable change that came out of "God Save the Dib" was making Dib's head bigger than his body, which became a reoccurring joke throughout the series.

The original name for Gaz's handheld game console was going to be "Game Slave Advanced", a spoof of Nintendo's handheld game console, the Game Boy Advance. However, the people at Nintendo did not like this parody and threatened to sue Nickelodeon if the name was used. So the name was changed to "Game Slave" instead.

Vasquez wanted to add some red blood splatters to certain violent scenes in the episode "Bestest Friend", but Nickelodeon forbade this. Also, at end of "Bestest Friend", Keef was originally going to fall off of a building and onto a power line, which would have electrocuted him, but Nickelodeon was worried that kids might try to imitate this behavior and demanded that it be changed. The next idea was that Keef gets run over by a car, and spins around on the tire as it drives away, but Nickelodeon denied this scene too, this time for being "too violent". In the final version, Keef gets attacked by a squirrel and falls off of a building, which Nickelodeon was fine with.Vasquez, Jhonen (2004). Invader Zim volume 1 DVD commentary for the episode "Bestest Friend" (DVD). Media Blasters.

In the episode "Hobo 13", Skoodge was going to be shown eating his own skin to survive, but Nickelodeon denied this scene and even the Invader Zim crew admitted that they thought it was "too much".

In the original ending of the episode "Walk of Doom", Zim and GIR were dropped off in a ghetto with Mexican music playing in the background and a banner reading "Welcome to Mexico". Feeling that it would come off as racist, Nickelodeon denied this and the scenery was changed to a vaguely Mexican-looking, but still filthy town, the music was changed to disco music and the banner was changed to say "CARNE", which translates into "MEAT".Vasquez, Jhonen (2004). Invader Zim volume 1 DVD commentary for the episode "Walk of Doom" (DVD). Media Blasters.

Originally, the episodes "Dark Harvest" and "Bestest Friend" were supposed to air together, but Nickelodeon would not allow this, saying that those two episodes are "too twisted" to air together. So instead, "Dark Harvest" aired with "Germs" and "Bestest Friend" aired with "NanoZim". Additionally, "Dark Harvest" was originally supposed to be called "The Hearts and Lungs of Zim's Darkness", but Nickelodeon denied this title.

In response to these censorships and restrictions, the writers of Invader Zim slipped in ways to poke fun at Nickelodeon, or to simply go against their wishes. This includes the character Nick, who is a boy that is always happy and a not-so-subtle reference to Nickelodeon's frequent demands that Vasquez make the show "happier" and more appealing to certain viewers, which Vasquez always detested.

Bloody GIR
"Bloody GIR", which depicts an image of GIR covered in blood, was created when series creator Jhonen Vasquez illustrated GIR covered in blood and wanted to put this drawing into an episode of Invader Zim. Nickelodeon, however, prohibited it. Director Steve Ressel and illustrator Chris Graham then snuck the forbidden drawing into a single frame of the episode "Bad, Bad Rubber Piggy". Post-production supervisor Jason Stiff has confirmed that the image does indeed appear in that episode, and Ressel also confirmed its existence in interviews. The image of Bloody GIR was reportedly scattered throughout the "last fourteen episodes" of the series by Ressel and Graham. Bloody GIR can be seen the most clearly during the intro to the episode "Mortos der Soulstealer". Although the idea for Bloody GIR was confirmed by Ressel not to have surfaced until the episode "Bad, Bad Rubber Piggy", some claim to have found it in earlier episodes of the series, such as "Dark Harvest" and "Attack of the Saucer Morons". Additionally, some people have claimed that Bloody GIR was meant to debut in the episode "GIR Goes Crazy and Stuff", in which GIR was supposed to be covered in blood while floating with the data canister and draining humans, but this directly contradicts Ressel's statements on the matter.

Many people believe that Bloody GIR was the reason behind the cancellation of Invader Zim. However, Vasquez has revealed that Nickelodeon did not find out about the image's inclusion until after the show's cancellation. Vasquez also stated that when it was discovered by Nickelodeon, they were not particularly bothered by it, since kids would not notice it anyway.

Certain images of Bloody GIR can only be seen in a frame-by-frame viewing. Otherwise, it will be a flash, or, in some cases, blended into the movements of the animation. Bloody GIR is never animated and will always appear as a still image. However, the opacity and size of the Bloody GIR is varied.

Cancellation

On January 18, 2002, Nickelodeon issued a statement announcing the show's cancellation after completing 27 episodes, instead of fulfilling the original 40 episodes order. On this subject, creator of the show Jhonen Vasquez said, "I could go on and on with variations of the most fantastic reasons for why the show was cancelled, but in the end, even I couldn't give you the whole and accurate truth for why the show got pulled," he wrote in a lengthy post on his website in 2010, nearly eight years after the show wrapped. "The most likely culprits are simply ratings and the sheer expense of the show, which was monstrously expensive at the time, especially when compared to more modern, flash-based savings fests."

Nearly nine years later in 2019, Vasquez was interviewed by Syfy and said: 

In an interview with Syfy in 2018, Richard Horvitz, the voice of Zim, was questioned about why the show got cancelled; he responded:

Broadcast history
 When Invader Zim was green-lit, Nickelodeon had desired a block of "mature, action-oriented" programming for an older demographic to compete with some of the stuff that Cartoon Network was doing at the time. But for unknown reasons, Invader Zim was the only series green-lit for this experiment and this block of "mature, action-oriented" shows never ended up happening. By the time the show was made, Nickelodeon had decided that they were no longer interested in trying to reach an older audience, which left Invader Zim hard to place in an appropriate time slot suitable for its originally intended demographic. Invader Zim ultimately ended up being sandwiched between The Fairly OddParents and Rocket Power, which did not feel like a suitable time slot for the show, according to the creator. Invader Zim was originally intended for 11–15 year olds, but due to its poor time slot placement, it ended up being viewed primarily by 6–10 year olds, many of whom were turned off by the show's dark and disturbing nature, resulting in the show receiving poor ratings and viewership.

Even though Invader Zim usually aired later at night, the show never found a time slot that the creators of the program thought was suitable for it and the show continuously suffered in ratings amongst 6–10 year olds, Nickelodeon's core demographic.

In an interview with IGN in 2004, Jhonen Vasquez said that when it became apparent that Nickelodeon was the "place for kids" but not "kids who want their eyes ripped out", they had asked for Invader Zim to be transferred to MTV or a more "adult network" similar to what Nickelodeon had previously done with The Ren & Stimpy Show, as the series did not feel right on Nickelodeon and would have likely found greater success elsewhere. This never ended up happening and instead, Nickelodeon buried the show with ever-changing time slots, which further hurt the show's ratings.Invader Zim premiered on March 30, 2001, and contains 20 episodes in its first season. At the beginning of the series, new episodes of Invader Zim were aired on Friday nights usually at 9:00PM (ET/PT). In August 2001, Nickelodeon officially renewed the series for a second season, which was originally planned to consist of 20 episodes.Invader Zims Friday night time slot ceased with the episode, "Door to Door" which was originally scheduled to premiere on September 14, 2001. But after the attacks of 9/11, three days prior, "Door to Door" and its paired episode "FBI Warning of Doom" ended up getting abruptly pulled from Nickelodeon's schedule and pushed back over six months to March 2002. This was partly because "Door to Door" contained a violent scene which resembled the attacks of 9/11, that now needed to be cut and re-done; but also due to the "blanket fears that anything remotely violent would be received as being in poor taste" given the atmosphere and condition of the country at the time. Invader Zim suffered creatively after 9/11 and Nickelodeon began frequently and inconveniently changing the shows' time slots with little promotion for new episodes which led to an even further drop in ratings and viewership.

The uncut version of "Door to Door" was accidentally aired on Nickelodeon on March 29, 2002, which was the first time the episode premiered. All subsequent airings of "Door to Door" were of the cut version.

 In January 2002, Nickelodeon announced that they had plans to cancel the series. Upon hearing this announcement, many fans became outraged at Nickelodeon for scheduling Invader Zim  for poor and frequently changing time slots towards the end of its run and for not providing the show with a good amount of promotional attention compared to some of their other shows at the time. Almost immediately after the announcement was made, fans launched an online petition to try to change Nickelodeon's mind or get the show picked up by a different network, and even though the petition collected over 55,000 signatures by April 2002, it was not enough to prevent Nickelodeon from canceling the show.

The episode "The Most Horrible X-Mas Ever" was broadcast out of order, as evident by the presence of the new character, Minimoose, who did not get a proper introduction. Minimoose's introductory episode is called "Nubs of Doom" and was originally intended to air before "The Most Horrible X-Mas Ever", but because Nickelodeon was planning on canceling the series, the show's staff had to pick and choose their final episodes very carefully and Jhonen Vasquez said he was more excited for "The Most Horrible X-Mas Ever", so that episode was made instead, leaving "Nubs of Doom" unfinished.Vasquez, Jhonen (2004). Invader Zim volume 1 DVD commentary for the episode "The Most Horrible X-Mas Ever" (DVD). Media Blasters.

The final episode of the series, "The Most Horrible X-Mas Ever", premiered on Nickelodeon on December 10, 2002. The show finished with a total of 27 of its initially contracted 40 episodes leaving at least 17 episode segments unfinished. Concept art, scripts, voice recordings, storyboards and animatics for some of these unfinished episodes can be found in the special features of some of the DVDs or online. Six of the completed second-season episodes initially went unreleased. These episodes would first appear on DVD in 2004 and later made their television debut on Nicktoons from June 10 to August 19, 2006.

On December 24, 2011, the series' pilot made its television debut on both Nickelodeon and Nicktoons (it had previously only been seen on DVD) after an eight-hour marathon and followed by the result of Nicktoons' "Girreatest Zim Moments" online poll.

Reruns of Invader Zim have been airing on Nicktoons since the channel's launch on May 1, 2002. The series premiered on NickSplat for the first time on January 2, 2019, with a seven-hour marathon before returning nightly as of January 7, 2020.

Both seasons of Invader Zim are available for download on the Xbox Live Marketplace and PlayStation Store. In addition, the entire series is available for purchase on Vudu, Google Play, YouTube and iTunes. The entire series is also available for streaming on Amazon Video and Paramount+.

Reception and legacy
Critical reception

Screen Rants Spencer Coriaty wrote: "Backed by some of the most cutting edge animation at the time, and still breathtaking by today's standards, Invader Zim is like a Mystery Science Theater fan's dream come true. It seamlessly blends sci-fi, action and comedy into one twisted and hilarious cartoon with superb voice acting and visionary direction." Kristy Punchko from Nerdist praised the series' satirical themes and how it "relished in weird, pushed boundaries, and dared to be unapologetically stupid". Punchko also offered praise for the humor in Invader Zim, saying: "Colliding the sublimely silly with the cerebral, Invader Zim played as seminal precursor to subversive sci-fi shows like Rick and Morty." Becca James, writing for The A.V. Club said, "Invader Zim was destined for a cult following. From its seemingly bizarre nature to its too-early demise, [Invader Zim] brought a darker form of entertainment to [Nickelodeon and] welcomed critical acclaim for straddling the line between child and adult entertainment [and the] constant depiction of Earth as a complete shitcan only adds to this dingy, but delightful program."

Allegra Frank from Polygon said:  Sam Thielman from The Guardian said, "[Invader Zim]'s sense of humor is somehow dark without being bleak; even when the show takes its cues from horror movies it's often quite scary, but it's somehow never too much. [...] Invader Zim didn't last nearly long enough, but it did spawn a cult following almost immediately and became a password for alienated millennials and teenagers everywhere." Alex Bedder, from NYU Local, said, "Essentially the black sheep of the animated Nickelodeon family, Invader Zim never quite stuck its landing, but it became a beloved and off-kilter fan favorite. [...] There are random, twitchy characters, the word "doom" is overused, and there are countless other illogical outbursts. But the common thread weaving all of the madness together is its original, sick, and sometimes oddly-intelligent sense of humor." In an article he wrote for Cartoon Brew, animation historian, Jerry Beck said: "I always thought highly of [Invader Zim], but watching it again this weekend reminded me how good it truly was. [...] I laugh long and hard at incidents, situations and visuals on [Invader Zim], and if there is any justice it should be ranked alongside the likes of South Park and The Simpsons."

Mary Grace Garis from Bustle praised Invader Zim for how it does not sugarcoat reality, saying, "You can't deny that [Invader Zim] really put in some heavy, soul crushing messages between "The Doom Song" and all those rubber piggies. And I'd say that a la The Powerpuff Girls, they did a really good job of hiding adult lessons in a children's cartoon, but well... I'm pretty sure they were a bit more blatant in delivering the news that we were all doomed." Kayla Cobb, of Decider said, "If you prefer your humor to be equal parts dark and random, then it's time to re-watch this short-lived Nicktoon. [Invader Zim] can best be characterized by its sarcasm, cruelty, and violence. This is a show that creates a disturbing giant monster baby fusion in one episode and labels the ultimate face of horror as a room with a moose the next. So yeah. It's kind of all over the place, which is why we love it." Lana Berkowitz, from The Houston Chronicle praised Invader Zims art-style and color palette saying, "The series has an appropriately gloomy look of impending doom colored with dark reds and black, and a dash of alien green. The animation's angular look and the characters' big, expressive eyes give Invader Zim a distinctive look."

Variety'''s Steven Oxman, wrote, "[Invader Zim] captures a nice blend of the innocent and the satirical". Further stating that, "The artwork [in the show] isn't especially original but still manages to create a nicely off-center vision of Earth and its inhabitants. Vasquez and co-writer Rob Hummel throw in some clever quips at life on this planet, taking aim particularly at the doomsaying schoolteacher, Ms. Bitters [and] Kevin Manthei's music provides strong accompaniment to the escapades." Sean Fitz-Gerald from Thrillist wrote: "Though Invader Zim came from Jhonen Vasquez, the same beautifully twisted mind behind Johnny the Homicidal Maniac, the [show] manages to hold off on graphic violence and obscenities without losing all its bite. The spastic [Zim], along with the world around him, capitalizes on cheeky, masochistic, and random humor in ways viewers of all ages can appreciate." Joe Matar writing for Den of Geek wrote: "Invader Zim is a brilliant piece of unsettling, grotesque horror, with a heart of goofiness, which is a big part of its appeal. [...] The incorporation of cel-shaded CGI and lots of sharp geometric shapes actually enhanced the look [of the show] rather than came off as a cheap shortcut." Andy Patrizio of IGN praised the colors and the CGI imagery in Invader Zim, but criticized how Zim is "always shrieking and yelling at the top of his lungs" and the inconsistencies between episodes, but added "When the show hits, it hits big."

George Dvorsky, from io9, specifically praised the character GIR, saying, "Science fiction has portrayed its fair share of glitchy and bumbling robots over the years, but none hold a candle to Invader Zims GIR. Quite possibly the most erratic and unhelpful robot to ever hit the screen, GIR has become one of the most loved and often quoted characters to appear in a sci-fi cartoon in years." Lynne Heffley, writing for Los Angeles Times said "The deliriously original Invader Zim rocks" offering praise for the show's humor and art-style, calling it a "visual feast of geometric lines, strange angles, vaulting curves, fantastic, transforming machines and odd, shadowed places." Sean Aitchison from CBR said, "Invader Zim not only holds up incredibly well, it also feels like it was rather ahead of its time and maybe it would have lasted longer today. [...] The weird humor, the eccentric characters and even the premise all feel like a show that would have easily gotten green-lit in the modern cartoon renaissance that began with Adventure Time. The show only ran for two seasons, which makes it such a shame when you realize how much it would have thrived in modern times." On the review aggregator website Rotten Tomatoes, Invader Zim currently holds a 100% approval rating based on 13 reviews. The website's critical consensus for season one reads: "The right balance of dark humor and spastic earnestness make Invader Zim a creepy kid's cartoon worthy of its cult following."

The now-defunct magazine Christian Parenting Today negatively criticized Invader Zim in their May 2001 issue, written by Jennifer Mangan, calling the show "non-Christian", "immoral", "offensive", "blasphemous", "unsuitable for Christian children" and "insulting towards Christian values and beliefs" due to the show's dark nature and negative characters like Gaz and Ms. Bitters, among other complaints. Common Sense Medias Andrea Graham wrote more negatively of Invader Zim, praising the show's "laugh-out-loud" humor, but criticizing the way that Zim has a complete lack of concern for all life, how humans are depicted as less-than-intelligent life forms, how human society is depicted as a terrible disgusting place, the very frequent use of verbal insults, and that there is no good messages or good role models in the show. Some parents have criticized Invader Zim for its pessimistic portrayal of humanity, the near constant-level of screaming among the characters, as well as the large amounts of verbal insults and threats, and the disturbing and disgusting content, calling it "unnecessary", "misanthropic", "too scary for children" and "inappropriate for children." According to director Steve Ressel, Nickelodeon held a test screening for the episode "Dark Harvest" during which one kid ran out of the room crying before the episode was over and others were visibly shaken and clearly terrified at what they saw.Vasquez, Jhonen (2004). Invader Zim volume 1 DVD commentary for the episode "Dark Harvest" (DVD). Media Blasters.

In 2006, IGN ranked Invader Zim at number 22 on their list of the Top 25 Primetime Animated Series of All Time and in 2009, IGN ranked Invader Zim at number 57 on their list of the Top 100 Animated Series. In 2016, Entertainment Weekly ranked Zim as the 18th Most Memorable Nickelodeon Character. That same year, Screen Rant ranked Invader Zim at number 9 on their list of the 25 Best Nickelodeon Shows and The Guardian ranked Invader Zim as the third Best Nickelodeon Cartoon. In 2017, CBR ranked Invader Zim at number 5 on their list titled, 15 Incredible Cartoons That Were Canceled For No Good Reason. In 2018, Paste Magazine ranked Invader Zim at number 60 on their list of The 100 Best Sci-Fi Shows of All Time. In 2018, IGN included the episode "The Most Horrible X-Mas Ever" on their list titled, 10 of the Best Holiday TV Episodes Ever.

RatingsInvader Zim garnered decent ratings for its premiere episode, with a 6.0 rating/17 share (about 1.8 million views) among kids ages 2–11. As the show went on, ratings and viewership began to decline amongst Nickelodeon's target audience of 2–11 year olds.

While Invader Zim was popular during its original run, Nickelodeon did not think the show was doing well because they were only focusing on a certain age group of viewers: 2–11 year olds. Even though Invader Zim was praised by critics and popular with viewers ages 14–18, the ratings amongst Nickelodeon's core demographic were just not high enough for the network to justify the expenses being put into the show, as Invader Zim was the most expensive show they were producing at the time. When Nickelodeon saw that some of their other shows with half the budget of Invader Zim were getting double the desired ratings amongst the 2–11 year old demographic, canceling the show just seemed to be the logical thing to do from a business perspective.

Despite the poor ratings the show received during its original run, reruns of Invader Zim tend to receive average to above average views and ratings. In March through July 2010, reruns of Invader Zim were aired on Nicktoons. These reruns became the second highest-rated show on the network, behind Avatar: The Last Airbender.

Awards and nominations

InvaderCONInvader Zim has its own fan convention known as InvaderCON, run by Wasabi Anime (also known as "Green Mustard Entertainment"). The initial event was created to celebrate the ten-year anniversary of Invader Zim and took place in Atlanta, Georgia on March 26–27, 2011. (The convention's date was set exactly ten years, to the weekend, from when the show first premiered: March 30, 2001.) Special guests included cast members Richard Steven Horvitz, Melissa Fahn, Rosearik Rikki Simons, Andy Berman and writer Eric Trueheart. The convention had over a thousand in attendance and featured many Invader Zim-related panels and activities; including a panel where the voice cast read the scripts for the unfinished episodes "Mopiness of Doom" and "Day of da Spookies". One dollar of each ticket purchased for InvaderCON was donated to the Juvenile Diabetes Research Foundation (JDRF). The choice of charity was selected by Richard Horvitz, who was one of the first guests to be booked. In the end, InvaderCON raised almost $2,000 for JDRF. InvaderCON was not endorsed, sanctioned or in any other way supported, directly or indirectly, by Viacom International, Inc. or Nickelodeon. But it was confirmed that a few representatives of Nickelodeon attended to observe the turnout and were quoted as being "overwhelmed".

InvaderCON was originally intended to be a one time event, but due to the success of the first InvaderCON and demand from fans, an encore presentation of the convention, InvaderCON II: DOOMCON, took place on July 28–29, 2012, in Los Angeles, California, featuring all of the previous year's guests (except for Andy Berman) with the addition of series creator Jhonen Vasquez, character designer Aaron Alexovich, voice of Professor Membrane Rodger Bumpass, post-production supervisor Jason Stiff, storyboard artist Ian Graham and a surprise appearance from voice of Almighty Tallest Red Wally Wingert. During this convention there was a panel where the voice cast read the script for the unfinished episode "The Trial".

According to InvaderCON's official website:

With over 10,000 fans on Facebook asking for another InvaderCON, Wasabi Anime decided to do InvaderCON "one last time". The third InvaderCON was funded via Kickstarter on June 21 – July 21, 2013. The Kickstarter was a success and exceeded its initial goal of $33,333. Wasabi Anime said they wanted the third InvaderCON to be located "in the middle" of where the previous InvaderCONs were located. Thus, Austin, Texas was chosen as its location since it is approximately 1,000 miles from Atlanta (InvaderCON 2011) and 1,300 miles from Los Angeles (InvaderCON 2012.) InvaderCON III: FINAL DOOM took place on July 26–27, 2014 in Austin, Texas. Special guests included cast members Richard Steven Horvitz, Melissa Fahn, Rosearik Rikki Simons, Rodger Bumpass and writer Eric Trueheart. At this convention there was a panel where the voice cast read the script for the unfinished episode "Ten Minutes to Doom".

Even though InvaderCON III: FINAL DOOM was originally intended to be the last InvaderCON, fans, as well as Wasabi Anime, continued to express interest in doing another InvaderCON. In the years following InvaderCON III: FINAL DOOM, the founder of Wasabi Anime, Tom Croom, repeatedly teased fans on Twitter with the possibilities of another InvaderCON on multiple different occasions.

On August 16, 2019, Wasabi Anime launched a Kickstarter to test the waters for a potential fourth InvaderCON event. The Kickstarter reached its $2,500 goal in just four days. In February 2020, it was officially announced that there would be a fourth InvaderCON event which was originally scheduled to take place in Boston, Massachusetts on August 7–9, 2020, as part of Fan Expo Boston. Due to the COVID-19 pandemic, it was postponed to August 6–8, 2021, along with Fan Expo Boston. The fourth InvaderCon event was later postponed again indefinitely. On March 30, 2021, InvaderCON hosted a Twitch livestream celebrating the twentieth anniversary of Invader Zim. It featured Richard Horvitz, Rikki Simons, Rodger Bumpass, Melissa Fahn, Olivia d’Abo, Wally Wingert, Aaron Alexovich, Eric Trueheart and Kevin Manthei. On November 13, 2021, Wasabi Anime revealed that they no longer have any plans for another InvaderCON event in the near future, but remain open to the possibilities of another convention.

InvaderCON, unlike some other projects done by Wasabi Anime (such as Florida Anime Experience), is not an annual show done in a city near where Wasabi Anime is located. InvaderCON's attendees at all three conventions were only about 20% locals. Over 80% of InvaderCON attendees came from outside the convention's host state. This made predicting attendance and budgeting for InvaderCON "very tricky and extremely risky" according to Wasabi Anime.

Influence
Bryan Konietzko, the co-creator of the Nickelodeon animated series Avatar: The Last Airbender, was a storyboard artist and art director on Invader Zim. Konietzko has said that the character of Aang was inspired by a drawing of an adult character he had originally designed while working on Invader Zim. When Konietzko first redesigned the character as Aang for Avatar: The Last Airbender he left visible "traces of Jhonen Vasquez's idiosyncratic style in the character's poses."

Rebecca Sugar, the creator of the Cartoon Network animated series Steven Universe, is a fan of Invader Zim and has admitted to reading and writing fan fiction and drawing fan art for Invader Zim when she was a teenager. Sugar has said, "I owe a whole lot to Jhonen Vasquez. His show Invader Zim was my gateway drug to the independent comic world. [...] Someday I hope to meet [Jhonen Vasquez] and thank him for changing my life." Additionally, Sugar provided the foreword for The Art of Invader Zim, in which she further discussed the positive impact the show has had on her life and career.

Vivienne "VivziePop" Medrano, the creator of Hazbin Hotel and Helluva Boss, is a fan of Invader Zim and has gone on to say that Invader Zim had a "huge influence" on her and her work.

In 2018, Wally Wingert, the voice of Almighty Tallest Red, noted during an interview with Den of Geek that "[T]he reason other shows like Adventure Time are [able to do some pretty intense stuff] is because the trail was blazed by [Jhonen Vasquez]. When Invader Zim came out, [the intense stuff we did on the show] was the new barometer by which you could get away with something. Up until then, all the other cartoons were relatively tame, but now you're seeing way darker stuff [in cartoons] than we ever did on Zim."

In 2019, Screen Rants Maddy Cohen observed that "[A]rguably, Invader Zim is one of the most influential animated shows to come out of [the early 2000s], with echoes of its humor and tone present in Adventure Time, Regular Show, Gravity Falls, and Steven Universe." That same year, Eric Vilas-Boas from Thrillist wrote "[Invader Zim] remained an influential cult classic, informing future cartoons like Avatar: The Last Airbender all the way up to Steven Universe, Gravity Falls, Rick and Morty, and beyond."

Controversy
Invader Zim became a controversial series when the show was mentioned at Scott Dyleski's murder trial in 2006. Dyleski, who was 17 at the time of the trial, was convicted of murdering his neighbor, and cited the Invader Zim episode "Dark Harvest" as his motivation for committing the murder. Dyleski said that after watching "Dark Harvest" he became "fascinated with collecting body parts" and "curious as to how the human body would function without certain organs", which inspired the murder—although the people who defended Dyleski said these comments were made in jest.

Related media

Netflix film 

On November 8, 2016, Harvey Beaks and Chowder creator, C. H. Greenblatt was asked by a fan on Tumblr if he would work with Jhonen Vasquez on an hypothetical Invader Zim movie, and Greenblatt responded, "Jhonen IS making an Invader Zim movie for Nick. I'm not a part of it, but I'm excited." However, Vasquez initially denied this on his Twitter, most likely because he was under contract to not say anything at the time and was forced to dismiss it as a rumor.

On April 4, 2017, over sixteen years since the series' debut and eleven years since the last unaired episode premiered in the United States, Nickelodeon officially announced that they had green-lit a 71-minute television film based on the series with three teaser trailers being released in a span of the following four days. Vasquez returned as executive producer and as the voice of Zim's computer, along with Kevin Manthei as the composer and Jenny Goldberg who worked on the Invader Zim comic book series as the Art Director for the movie. Most of the cast members from the television series reprised their roles in the movie including: Richard Steven Horvitz as Zim, Rosearik Rikki Simons as GIR, Andy Berman as Dib, Melissa Fahn as Gaz, Wally Wingert as Almighty Tallest Red, Kevin McDonald as Almighty Tallest Purple, Rodger Bumpass as Professor Membrane, Olivia d'Abo as Tak and Paul Greenberg as Poonchy.

At San Diego Comic-Con 2018, Jhonen Vasquez explained that Nickelodeon had been asking him about doing more Invader Zim for years and that he always had to decline their offers either because he was busy working on something else or due to not being able to come to an agreement with Nickelodeon on a budget for a Invader Zim revival. But being completely miserable with the other things he was working on at the time, Vasquez accepted Nickelodeon's latest offer to do more Invader Zim. Nickelodeon initially wanted a new Invader Zim television series, but Vasquez suggested a six-episode miniseries instead. He soon changed his mind to a television movie, since doing a movie would be "infinitely less stressful".

Invader Zim: Enter the Florpus had a panel at San Diego Comic-Con on July 20, 2018. During the panel, some never before seen production art such as backgrounds and turn-around charts for the movie were revealed. A trailer put together out of unedited first take animation for the movie was also shown at the panel accompanied by some original music composed for the trailer by Kevin Manthei. During the panel, Vasquez explained that he put the trailer together out of some random animated footage he had for the movie that he thought looked presentable enough to show people and that most of the shots used in the trailer were going to be sent back overseas to be re-animated. Vasquez also revealed that they had written the movie in 2015 and that at the time of the panel, they were currently in the process of getting first take animation back from their overseas animation team, Maven Animation Studios, in South Korea.

On May 10, 2019, Viacom president Robert Bakish revealed in a conference call that Netflix has acquired the distribution rights to Invader Zim: Enter the Florpus. The movie was released on Netflix on August 16, 2019.

Video games 

Invader Zim has yet to have a stand-alone video game release, but has been featured in several Nickelodeon related video games.

The 2002 game, Nickelodeon Party Blast includes Zim as a playable character in every version of the game. There are also multiple Invader Zim-themed stages in Nickelodeon Party Blast, including a level in which the player competes against Dib and Gaz. Although they are not playable characters, GIR can be seen in the background of several levels and Almighty Tallest Purple is shown in the background of the level where the player competes against Dib and Gaz.

In the 2004 Game Boy Advance exclusive game, Nicktoons: Freeze Frame Frenzy, the final stage of the game takes place on Zim's ship and Zim and GIR are the final boss of the game, but Zim becomes a playable character once the photo album is complete. Additionally, GIR, Dib, Gaz, Keef, Dirge, Ms. Bitters (mistakenly called "Mr. Bitters") and Bill the Paranormal Investigator (mistakenly called "Prof. Membrane") appear in the photo album as well as in the background of various levels throughout the game.

Zim's Voot Cruiser and house can be seen briefly in different worlds in the console versions of the 2006 game Nicktoons: Battle for Volcano Island.

In the console versions of the 2007 game Nicktoons: Attack of the Toybots, the EvilToyCo Factory, Zone 3 (Part 2) and the Master Model Chamber are Irken-themed. Additionally, GIR appears in the game as a Master Model (unlockable) and becomes a playable character once he is rescued. Both Zim and GIR are unlockable and playable characters in the Nintendo DS version of Nicktoons: Attack of the Toybots, although there are no Invader Zim-themed levels in this version of the game.

Both Zim and Dib are playable characters in every version of the 2008 game, SpongeBob SquarePants featuring Nicktoons: Globs of Doom. In the PlayStation 2 and Wii versions of the game, the second world is modeled after and called Zim's Town, and the boss battle of the world takes place inside Zim's house and is against GIR. In the Nintendo DS version of the game, the fifth world takes place on Zim's space station and the boss battle of the world is against The Almighty Tallest.

The 2008 game, Nicktoons: Android Invasion, exclusively released on the educational Didj platform, is set entirely inside Zim's base. Zim is the final boss in the game and several other characters from the series make appearances throughout the game.

The 2009 arcade-exclusive game Nicktoons Nitro includes Zim as a playable character in his Voot Cruiser, and there is a race course called "Irken City".

Zim and Gaz are playable characters in every version of the 2011 game Nicktoons MLB. GIR appears in the game as one of the announcers, and there is a ballpark called "Irken Field". Other characters from the show appear in the game as cameos when the game is loading and on the character cards.

Zim and GIR are playable characters in the 2019 official mobile game Nickelodeon Super Brawl Universe. There is also a location in the game set inside Zim's base and an Invader Zim themed challenge called "Doomsday Challenge".

Invader Zim characters and locations are included in the racing game, Nickelodeon Kart Racers 2: Grand Prix, released on October 6, 2020, for PlayStation 4, Xbox One, and Nintendo Switch, and released on December 1, 2020, for Microsoft Windows.

Zim is a playable character in the fighting game, Nickelodeon All-Star Brawl released on October 5, 2021 for PlayStation 4, PlayStation 5, Xbox One, Xbox Series X/S, Nintendo Switch, and Microsoft Windows.

Zim is a playable character in the mobile game, Nickelodeon Extreme Tennis released on January 21, 2022 exclusively on Apple Arcade. Zim's secret base is also a location in the game.

The online game Smite did a crossover with Nickelodeon on July 12, 2022. The crossover featured a handful of Nickelodeon characters, including Zim, as skins. However, the crossover attracted criticism for its decision to replace Richard Horvitz as the voice of Zim, with Horvitz himself calling the decision "offensive" and "disrespectful."

Podcasts 
There are two episodes of the Nickelodeon Animation Podcast that primarily discuss Invader Zim. The first one is season one episode fourteen, an interview with series creator Jhonen Vasquez, which was released on August 12, 2016. The second one is season two episode twenty-seven, an interview with the Invader Zim cast, which was released on January 6, 2017. Both episodes are available on YouTube, iTunes and SoundCloud.

The complete Invader Zim series was covered on "Wizard and the Bruiser" on February 21, 2019.

Comic book series

On February 20, 2015, American publishing company, Oni Press announced that they would be releasing an official Comic Book series based on Invader Zim, in collaboration with Jhonen Vasquez and Nickelodeon. A pre-issue 0 was released on May 23, 2015, as a zine and foreshadow to the comic book series. The first issue was released on July 8, 2015, and since then most issues are released on a monthly basis.

On February 11, 2020, it was announced that the monthly Invader Zim comic would end with issue #50, which was released in March 2020, and a new comic series titled Invader Zim Quarterly would begin in June 2020, releasing on a quarterly schedule. Additionally, in July 2020, Oni Press will launch a new "Best of..." trade paperback collections, which will collect a selection of stories from Oni Press's monthly Invader Zim comic series.

Other literature 
Invader Zim made appearances in Nickelodeon Magazine between 2001 and 2008, which include Invader Zim trivia, exclusive interviews, and an official four-page comic titled, Invader Zim: Quick! Run While You Still Have Your Insides!!! by Jhonen Vasquez.

A book titled Not Just Cartoons: Nicktoons! was published on October 29, 2007, and written by animation historian Jerry Beck. The book collects more than five hundred illustrations, images, storyboards, concept art, quotes, interviews and anecdotes, among other special behind-the-scenes content for Nickelodeon's first thirty-one cartoons. Not Just Cartoons: Nicktoons! contains a short chapter about Invader Zim, featuring some storyboards, images, illustrations, turn-around charts, character model sheets and short, exclusive interviews with series creator Jhonen Vasquez, executive producer Mary Harrington and head writer Frank Conniff.

An official art book titled The Art of Invader Zim was released on July 28, 2020. Published by Abrams Books and written and designed by Chris McDonnell, The Art of Invader Zim contains the definitive history of the original Invader Zim television series, the Invader Zim comic book series, and the television movie, Invader Zim: Enter the Florpus. It offers a fully authorized, all-access compendium of never-before-published production art, storyboards, behind-the-scenes photos, and ephemera. The art book also features exclusive interviews with Jhonen Vasquez and other key crewmembers that reveal the origins, art, and imagination behind the Invader Zim franchise.

Series writer Eric Trueheart wrote a book titled The Medium-Sized Book of Zim Scripts: Vol. 1: Pigs 'n' Waffles: The stories, and the stories behind the stories of your favorite Invader, which was released digitally on April 2, 2020, and a paperback version was released on July 27, 2020. The book collects the original scripts from the episodes: "Bad, Bad Rubber Piggy," "Hamstergeddon," "GIR Goes Crazy and Stuff," "Zim Eats Waffles," "Mortos der Soulstealer," and the unfinished episode, "Pants!," which was later adapted into an issue of the Invader Zim comic book series. The book also contains commentary on the writing process of Invader Zim.

Theme park ride
There is an Invader Zim theme park ride at American Dream's Nickelodeon Universe called Invader Zim's Flip & Spin... OF DOOM! which opened on October 25, 2019, along with the park. The ride is a bumper cars style attraction made by Amusement Products LLC where riders can spin and flip upside down on impact. The official summary of the ride states "You've been recruited for battle onboard Irk's latest militarized spacecraft. Help Zim's invasion as you flip, spin and bump into poor, unsuspecting humans."

References in other media
Zim and GIR flying in the Voot Cruiser made a cameo appearance in the now-defunct simulator ride Jimmy Neutron's Nicktoon Blast at Universal Studios Florida.

In the 2013 animated feature film Escape from Planet Earth, the word "Zim" can be seen written on the floor in graffiti in one brief scene, along with the names of multiple other aliens from various different movies and television shows.

Invader Zim was featured as a clue on the July 29, 2013, episode of Jeopardy!. The clue was for $2000 under the category "What a Character!" and it read "Irk is the home planet of this title 'invader.'" None of the contestants were able to answer the question correctly.

Ms. Bitters made a cameo appearance in the Nickelodeon animated series The Loud House during the episode "Linc or Swim", alongside several other elderly characters from other Nicktoons series.

In the 2016 short film TMNT: Don vs Raph, which was written by Jhonen Vasquez, a picture of Zim is seen on the side of a building.

Questions about Invader Zim have been featured in several episodes of the 2021 game show Tooned In.

Invader Zim comic books and cardboard cutouts were shown in the background of the 2022 Nickelodeon series Warped!.

Childish Gambino references Invader Zim in his song entitled "Bonfire."

Merchandise

Home video
On October 13, 2003, Media Blasters announced that they were planning on releasing DVD collections of Invader Zim through their Anime Works imprint. They released the first volume titled Doom Doom Doom on May 11, 2004. On August 31, 2004, volume two titled Progressive Stupidity was released and on October 12, 2004, volume three titled Horrible Holiday Cheer was released, completing the series' initial DVD release. All three volumes contain animatics, Irken subtitles and digitally restored and remastered picture and sound. They also include audio commentaries for the majority of episodes, exclusive interviews with the voice actors, writers, and the post production staff and the series pilot. A box set shaped like Zim's house, known as the House Box Set has also been released, which includes all three volumes, plus an extra disc for bonus features, which includes the uncut version of "The Most Horrible X-Mas Ever", voice recordings for seven of the unfinished episodes, interviews with Kevin Manthei on the sound design and music of Invader Zim, and a soundtrack of Kevin Manthei's main compositions for the show. Originally, this set included a duty-mode "GIR" figurine in the roof compartment of the box set, but Media Blasters silently stopped including it with the termination of Palisades Toys, the company that had been producing Invader Zim figurines. Another DVD box set for Invader Zim called the Complete Invasion Box Set was released in 2006, featuring all three of the DVD volumes boxed together, with the art of Volume One on the cover. This box set does not contain an extra disc for bonus features like the House Box Set included. In 2004, Media Blasters also released two Invader Zim MiniDVDs, each containing one episode.

On May 4, 2010, the complete Season 1 of Invader Zim was released on DVD via Manufacture on demand in a DVD-R format. A Season 2 DVD was released in that same format on April 2, 2010. Neither of these DVDs contain audio commentaries or special features.

On February 22, 2011, an Invader Zim DVD was released called Operation Doom. This DVD contains the eight highest-rated episodes that reran on the Nicktoons Network throughout 2010.

Episodes of Invader Zim have been featured in several Nickelodeon compilation DVDs. This includes Nickstravaganza! 2, which was released on September 2, 2003, and contains the episode "The Nightmare Begins". (Nickstravaganza! 2 was also released in a VHS format which contains the exact same contents as the DVD version.) A DVD titled Classic Nickelodeon Halloween Specials, which was released on October 1, 2015, contains the episode "Halloween Spectacular of Spooky Doom". The episode "The Most Horrible X-Mas Ever" was featured in a DVD called A Very Nickelodeon Christmas, which was released on November 4, 2015.

Figurines and toys

Two series of collectible Invader Zim articulated figurines were produced by the company Palisades Toys and released from 2004 to 2006. The first series includes: Zim, GIR, Dib, Ms. Bitters, and Almighty Tallest Purple. The second series includes: Zim in his human disguise, GIR in his dog suit, Gaz, Almighty Tallest Red, and the Robo-Parents. The figurines vary in height from 4-8 inches (10–20 cm). All of the characters in each series come with a detailed display base, as well as multiple character-appropriate accessories. A third series was planned to include: Zim in his Santa Suit, GIR as an elf, Professor Membrane, Tak, and Nightmare Ms. Bitters, but this series was not made because Palisades Toys, the manufacturer, ceased operations in early 2006. A multitude of other collectible Invader Zim figurines were produced before the termination of Palisades Toys. This includes figurines of: Germ Fighting Zim, Germ GIR, Zim in his old man disguise, Angry Zim, and GIR in his dog disguise with hood down. Palisades Toys released the Invader Zim Miniature Figurine Set... of DOOM! a separate set of smaller non-articulated figurines, featuring: Zim in his human disguise first seen in "The Girl Who Cried Gnome", Gaz in her Beaver Suit, Bologna Dib and GIR riding the Piggy. A miniature replica of Zim's house, the Voot Cruiser, GIR on the giant Piggy with a UFO Convention background display and a "Mega GIR" figurine that is twelve inches in height and included a removable dog disguise were also released. The Invader Zim Special Edition set of Doom! was produced by Palisades Toys, but released after the company had shut down. This set contains figurines of: Screaming Zim in his human disguise, Doggie Suit Duty Mode GIR, Neutral Faced Almighty Tallest Red, Hypnotized Dib, and Shadow Ms. Bitters.

Several Invader Zim figurines made by Palisades Toys were released as Hot Topic exclusives. These include figurines of: Angry Almighty Tallest Purple, Contemplative Almighty Tallest Red, Duty Mode GIR, Screaming GIR, Robot GIR with removable dog disguise, Haywire Robo-Parents, Snarling Ms. Bitters, Pustulio Zim, Angry Dib and Freakout Gaz.

Multiple official Plushies were made to promote the Invader Zim series. This includes plushies of: Zim, Germ Zim, Pustulio Zim, Piggy, Robot GIR, GIR with hot dog, GIR eating pizza, Doggie GIR, Chinese takeout GIR, GIR with Piggy, Germ GIR, GIR fuzzy car dice, GIR plush backpack, GIR eating cupcake and GIR eating ice cream. Plushies of Zim and GIR were released as part of the Nick '90s Jumbo Plush set that was made for crane machines.

Funko has released many Pop! Vinyl figures of GIR in several variations including: GIR in his dog suit, Robot GIR, GIR with cupcake, glow in the dark GIR, Zim and GIR, Zim and GIR on the pig, and a mini GIR keychain. These are usually sold as Hot Topic exclusives. A Pop! Vinyl figure of Zim with Minimoose was released as a San Diego Comic-Con 2020 exclusive.

In 2015, a company called Ikon Collectables released an officially licensed 9-inch tall limited edition statue of GIR on the pig.

In 2016, Zag Toys released some officially licensed Invader Zim Original Minis and Plush Clip-Ons.

In 2017, Vision Toys released some officially licensed laser cut 3D keychains of some Invader Zim characters.

In 2018, Diamond Select Toys released some Vinimates figurines of Zim, Zim in his human disguise, GIR and GIR in his dog disguise. All four of these figurines were released as Hot Topic exclusives and limited to 1,000 units each. Another set of Invader Zim Vinimates called Extra Doom Edition contains figurines of shadowy Zim and shadowy GIR. This set was released as a San Diego Comic-Con 2019 exclusive and limited to 250 units.

FOCO released some Eekeez figurines of Zim and GIR in his dog suit that were exclusively available at New York Comic Con in 2018. FOCO also released some Eekeez figurines variants of Zim and GIR in his dog suit that were exclusively available at San Diego Comic Con in 2018. An Eekeez figurine metallic variant of GIR was released as an WonderCon 2019 exclusive. An Eekeez figurine metallic variant of Zim was released as an Emerald City Comic Con 2019 exclusive and limited to 300 units.

In 2020, Hot Topic released some officially licensed rubber Bend-Ems figures of Zim and Dib.

Other merchandise
Nickelodeon has licensed a multitude of official Invader Zim products including: a wide variety of clothing, fashion accessories, makeup, jewelry, tabletop games, backpacks, bags, home accessories and decorations, office supplies, car accessories, household appliances, novelty items, holiday decorations, hygiene items and more, all commonly sold at stores like Hot Topic, Newbury Comics, Spencer's and other speciality retailers.

Invader Zim merchandise has been included in subscription boxes such as Loot Crate in September 2017 and The Nick Box in fall 2020.

Failed revival attempts
In March through July 2010, reruns of Invader Zim were aired on Nicktoons. The reruns were the second highest-rated show on the network, and according to Jhonen Vasquez, were part of a plan by the network to see if a revival of the series would be feasible. However, the budget Nickelodeon proposed was not quite big enough for what the crew wanted to do, so they respectfully declined the offer. Vasquez also asserted that, despite the widespread rumor suggesting otherwise, he would have returned to the show again had Nickelodeon not deemed the revival "too expensive" for what the crew wanted to do with it.

In 2011, Nickelodeon approached Rikki Simons, the voice of GIR, about doing some animated shorts revolving around GIR. While Simons was open to reprising his role, nothing ever came of these shorts for unknown reasons. During an Invader Zim panel at Long Beach Comic Con 2019, Simons said the reason why these GIR shorts never went anywhere might have been because "It's kinda weird to do GIR by himself. I don't know what that would be."

Notes

References

External links

Invader Zim at Don Markstein's Toonopedia. Archived from the original on September 17, 2016.

 
2000s American animated television series
2000s American black comedy television series
2000s American children's comedy television series
2000s American comic science fiction television series
2000s American horror comedy television series
2000s Nickelodeon original programming
2001 American television series debuts
2002 American television series endings
2006 American television series endings
Alien invasions in television
Television series about alien visitations
Works by Jhonen Vasquez
Anime-influenced Western animated television series
American children's animated space adventure television series
American children's animated horror television series
American children's animated comic science fiction television series
American children's animated science fantasy television series
Animated television series about children
Animated television series about extraterrestrial life
Animated television series about robots
Animation controversies in television
Annie Award winners
Censored television series
Emmy Award-winning programs
English-language television shows
Media Blasters
Nicktoons
Teen animated television series
Television franchises
Television controversies in the United States
Television shows adapted into comics
Television shows adapted into films